Qarah Qach (also Romanized as Qarah Qāch, Qarah Qāj, Qaragaj, Qareh Qāch, and Qareh Qāj) is a village in Daland Rural District, in the Central District of Ramian County, Golestan Province, Iran. At the 2006 census, its population was 2,190, in 533 families.

References 

Populated places in Ramian County